Isipingo Secondary is a high school located in Isipingo Hills in Isipingo, KwaZulu-Natal, South Africa.

External links
Isipingo Secondary Website

Schools in KwaZulu-Natal
High schools in South Africa